Bailando 2017 is the twelfth season of Bailando por un Sueño. The season premiere aired on May 29, 2017, on El Trece. Although, the competition started the next day (May 30). Marcelo Tinelli returns as the host of the show's.

On December 18, 2017, actress & reality TV star Florencia Vigna and professional dancer Gonzalo Gerber were announced winners, marking the second win for Vigna. In second place was Federico Bal and Laura Fernández.

Cast

Teams 
Initially, 27 teams were confirmed. This season 8 couples made up of celebrities participate, they are: Alejandro Müller & Roxana Cravero; Federico Bal & Laura Fernández; Gastón Soffritti & Agustina Agazzani; José María Muscari & Noelia Marzol; José Ottavis & Bárbara Silenzi; Lourdes Sánchez & Gabriel Usandivaras; Pedro Alfonso & Florencia Vigna (winners of the previous edition, defenders of the title) and Rocío Guirao Díaz & Nicolas Paladini.

For the second time in the history of Bailando, a celebrity (politician José Ottavis) was disqualified, the reason for his expulsion was the breach of contract. Santiago Griffo enters his place.

Throughout the competition, contestants withdrew from the competition: Pedro Alfonso, Naiara Awada, Gastón Soffritti & Agustina Agazzani and Rocío Guirao Díaz & Nicolas Paladini. In the case of Alfonso and Awanda they had replacement (Agustín Casanova and Micaela Viciconte, respectively). In the case of the couples made up of celebrities (Soffritti & Agazzani and Guirao Díaz & Paladini) they were not replaced. Later, Casanova, Pedro Alfonso's replacement, also retired.

After the resignations of Pedro Alfonso and Agustín Casanova, Florencia Vigna changed teams twice. Finally, she danced alongside dancer Gonzalo Gerber (Casanova's replacement). In the latter instance, she became the only celebrity on the team.

For the first time in the show's history, two non-famous contestants participated: Beatriz Prandi and Consuelo Peppino. The idea of featuring a non-famous male contestant was also raised, but ultimately did not happen.

In quotation marks («»), the nicknames.

Hosts and judges

Marcelo Tinelli returned as host while Moria Casán, Marcelo Polino, Ángel de Brito, and Pampita Ardohaín returned as judges. Soledad Silveyra did not return as a judge this season. On June 9, Marcelo Tinelli suffered a health problem, in the live, and was replaced by Moria Casán, so Hugo Ávila, choreographer and coach chief, replaced her momentarily. On July 24 and 25, The actress, singer and dancer, Griselda Siciliani was present replacing Moria Casán and Pampita Ardohaín because they will participate as guests in the salsa in trio, next to Freddy Villarreal and Hernán Piquín respectively.

Scoring chart 

 In italics, partial scores without the secret ballot.

Red numbers indicate the lowest score for each style.
Green numbers indicate the highest score for each style.
 Indicates the couple sentenced.
 Indicates the couple was saved by the judges.
 Indicates the couple was saved by the public.
 Indicates the couple eliminated that week.
 Indicates the couple withdrew.
 Indicates the couple was disqualified by the production.
 Indicates the winning couple.
 Indicates the runner-up couple.
 Indicates the semi-finalists couples.

Notes:

A: All couples are sent to duel to define the semifinalists.

Highest and lowest scoring performances
The best and worst performances in each dance according to the judges' 40-point scale are as follows:

Styles, scores and songs

Round 1: Disco 

      Sentenced: Ezequiel Cwirkaluk (13), La Tigresa del Oriente (13), Alejandro Müller & Roxana Cravero (13), Marielys Alvarado (14) and Gladys Jiménez (17)
      Saved by the judges: Ezequiel Cwirkaluk,  Marielys Alvarado and Gladys Jiménez
      Saved by the public: Alejandro Müller & Roxana Cravero (60.83%)
      Eliminated: La Tigresa del Oriente (39.17%)
      Disqualified: José Ottavis & Bárbara Silenzi

Round 2: Cumbia 

      Sentenced: Nancy Pazos (14), Alejandro Müller & Roxana Cravero (14), Ezequiel Cwirkaluk (17) and Marielys Alvarado (19)
      Saved by the judges: Ezequiel Cwirkaluk and Nancy Pazos
      Saved by the public: Alejandro Müller & Roxana Cravero (61.96%)
      Eliminated: Marielys Alvarado (38.04%)

Round 3: Hits 

      Sentenced: Ezequiel Cwirkaluk (15), Beatriz Prandi (17) and Santiago Griffo & Bárbara Silenzi (19)
      Saved by the judges: Ezequiel Cwirkaluk
      Saved by the public: Santiago Griffo & Bárbara Silenzi (77.11%)
      Eliminated: Beatriz Prandi (22.89%)
      Withdrew: Pedro Alfonso

Round 4: Trio Salsa 

 
      Sentenced: Yanina Latorre (14), Santiago Griffo & Bárbara Silenzi (15), Consuelo Peppino (21) and Alejandro Müller & Roxana Cravero (21)
      Saved by the judges: Santiago Griffo & Bárbara Silenzi and Yanina Latorre
      Saved by the public: Consuelo Peppino (80.67%)
      Eliminated: Alejandro Müller & Roxana Cravero (19.33%)

Round 5: Reggaeton 

 
      Sentenced: David Martínez (12), Melina Lezcano (13), Jey Mammón (13) and Gastón Soffritti & Agustina Agazzani (15)
      Saved by the judges: Melina Lezcano and Jey Mammón
      Saved by the public: Gastón Soffritti & Agustina Agazzani (54.71%)
      Eliminated: David Martínez (45.29%)

Round 6: Folklore 

 
      Sentenced: José María Muscari & Noelia Marzol (14), Ezequiel Cwirkaluk (14), Christian Sancho (17) and Gastón Soffritti & Agustina Agazzani (21)
      Saved by the judges: Ezequiel Cwirkaluk and Gastón Soffritti & Agustina Agazzani
      Saved by the public: Christian Sancho (58.21%)
      Eliminated: José María Muscari & Noelia Marzol (41.79%)

Round 7: Cuarteto in Trio 

 
      Sentenced: Melina Lezcano (13), Gastón Soffritti & Agustina Agazzani (13), Nancy Pazos (15), Silvina Luna (19) and Christian Sancho (19)
      Saved by the judges: Melina Lezcano, Gastón Soffritti & Agustina Agazzani and Nancy Pazos
      Saved by the public: Silvina Luna (54.83%)
      Eliminated: Christian Sancho (45.17%)

Round 8: Cha-cha-pop 

 
      Sentenced: Ezequiel Cwirkaluk (13), Agustín Casanova & Florencia Vigna (15), Santiago Griffo & Bárbara Silenzi (15), Consuelo Peppino (15), Silvina Luna (22) and Freddy Villarreal (22)
      Saved by the judges: Santiago Griffo & Bárbara Silenzi, Ezequiel Cwirkaluk and Agustín Casanova & Florencia Vigna
      Saved by the public: Consuelo Peppino (67.39%)
      Eliminated: Silvina Luna (12.05%) and Freddy Villarreal (20.56%) 
      Withdrew: Naiara Awada and Gastón Soffritti & Agustina Agazzani

Round 9: Free Style 

 
      Sentenced: Federico Bal & Laura Fernández (9), Micaela Viciconte (17), Yanina Latorre (17), Agustín Casanova & Florencia Vigna (22) and Consuelo Peppino (22)
      Saved by the judges: Agustín Casanova & Florencia Vigna, Consuelo Peppino and Federico Bal & Laura Fernández
      Saved by the public: Micaela Viciconte (81.09%)
      Eliminated: Yanina Latorre (18.91%)

Round 10: Rock – Jive 

 
      Sentenced: Nancy Pazos (13), Cecilia Bonelli (16), María Sol Pérez (20), Ezequiel Cwirkaluk (20) and Jey Mammón (20) 
      Saved by the judges: Jey Mammón and Ezequiel Cwirkaluk
      Saved by the public: María Sol Pérez (52.93%)
      Eliminated: Cecilia Bonelli (13.68%) and Nancy Pazos (33.39%)
      Withdrew: Rocío Guirao Díaz & Nicolás Paladini

Round 11: Tango or Milonga 

 
      Sentenced: Federico Bal & Laura Fernández (11), Ezequiel Cwirkaluk (11), Florencia Vigna (17), Santiago Griffo & Bárbara Silenzi (22), Consuelo Peppino (22) and Jey Mammón (22)
      Saved by the judges: Florencia Vigna, Federico Bal & Laura Fernández and Jey Mammón
      Saved by the public: Consuelo Peppino (44.09%)
      Eliminated: Ezequiel Cwirkaluk (27.33%) and Santiago Griffo & Bárbara Silenzi (28.58%) 
      Withdrew: Agustín Casanova

Round 12: Merengue 

 
      Sentenced: Jey Mammón (13), Micaela Viciconte (16), Lourdes Sánchez & Gabriel Usandivaras (20), Gladys Jiménez (20) and Consuelo Peppino (20)
      Saved by the judges: Gladys Jiménez, Lourdes Sánchez & Gabriel Usandivaras and Micaela Viciconte
      Saved by the public: Jey Mammón (51.66%)
      Eliminated: Consuelo Peppino (48.34%)

Round 13: Tributes 

 
      Sentenced: Micaela Viciconte (18), Federico Bal & Laura Fernández (23), Gladys Jiménez (23), Florencia Vigna (23), Mariela Anchipi (23) and Jey Mammón (34)
      Saved by the judges: Federico Bal & Laura Fernández, Florencia Vigna and Gladys Jiménez
      Saved by the public: Micaela Viciconte (51.99%)
      Eliminated: Mariela Anchipi (11.38%) and Jey Mammón (36.63%)

Round 14: Ballet 

 
      Sentenced: María Sol Pérez (14), Gladys Jiménez (14), Micaela Viciconte (20), Florencia Vigna (20) and Melina Lezcano (25)
      Saved by the judges: Florencia Vigna and Micaela Viciconte
      Saved by the public: María Sol Pérez (42.86%)
      Eliminated: Gladys Jiménez (17.78%) and Melina Lezcano (39.36%)

Round 15: Latin pop 

 
      Saved by the judges: Federico Bal & Laura Fernández, Lourdes Sánchez & Gabriel Usandivaras and Hernán Piquín
      Saved by the public: Florencia Vigna (41.31%)
      Eliminated: María Sol Pérez (18.11%) and Micaela Viciconte (40.58%)

Semifinals: Rock – Jive / Folklore / Cha-cha-pop / Cuarteto

1st Semi-final 

Notes
 : The point is for the couple.
 : The point is not for the couple.
Result
      Finalist: Florencia Vigna
      Semifinalist: Hernán Piquín

2nd Semifinal 

Notes
: The point is for the couple.
: The point is not for the couple.
Result
      Finalists: Federico Bal & Laura Fernández
      Semifinalists: Lourdes Sánchez & Gabriel Usandivaras

Final: Disco / Tango or Milonga / Merengue / Cumbia pop 

Notes:
: The point is for the couple.
: The point is not for the couple.
Result:
      Winner: Florencia Vigna
      Runners-up: Federico Bal & Laura Fernández

References

External links

Argentina
Argentine variety television shows
2017 Argentine television seasons